The following are the national records in athletics in Equatorial Guinea maintained by its national athletics federation: Federación Ecuatoguineana de Atletismo (FEA).

Outdoor

Key to tables:

ht = hand timing

# = not recognised by IAAF

Men

Women

Indoor

Men

Women

Notes

References
General
World Athletics Statistic Handbook 2019: National Outdoor Records
World Athletics Statistic Handbook 2018: National Indoor Records
Specific

External links

Equatorial Guinea
Records
Athletics